Jay M. Bernhardt is a health communication scholar, public health leader, professor and college administrator. Bernhardt has served as the dean of the Moody College of Communication at The University of Texas at Austin since March 2016. He was reappointed as dean effective Sept. 1, 2022. This term was cut short by his appointment as the 13th President of Emerson College in January 2023.  At UT Austin, he was the founding director of the Center for Health Communication in 2015. He serves on multiple boards of directors and is the founder of national nonprofit organizations including the Alliance of Schools and Colleges of Communication and Journalism and the Society for Health Communication.

Education
Bernhardt attended Rutgers, the State University of New Jersey, where he earned a B.A. in sociology and minored in computer science. He earned a Master of Public Health (MPH) degree from Rutgers and the University of Medicine and Dentistry of New Jersey. Bernhardt earned his Ph.D. in public health from the University of North Carolina at Chapel Hill (UNC) with an interdisciplinary focus on health communication.
 
He's been inducted into honor societies including the Cap and Skull Society at Rutgers and the Order of the Grail-Valkyries at UNC, and received awards including the Everett M. Rogers Award for Excellence in Health Communication and the Jay S. Drotman Memorial Award from the American Public Health Association.

Career
Bernhardt began his academic career as an assistant professor in the School of Health and Human Performance at the University of Georgia in 1999 before joining the Rollins School of Public Health at Emory University in 2001. From 2005-10, Bernhardt worked at the Centers for Disease Control and Prevention (CDC), where he directed the National Center for Health Marketing, overseeing and advancing the agency’s communication, marketing, partnerships, and new media innovations. In 2010, he joined the School of Health and Human Performance at the University of Florida, where he served as department chair, professor and center director. He joined UT Austin in July 2014 as professor, established the Center for Health Communication and was named interim dean in 2015.

His research is focused on digital health through the application of communication and technology to public health and healthcare. He was among the first to research wireless mobile technology for health-related data collection and personalized text messages, and the application of new and social media for health communication. His research has been funded by the National Institutes for Health, the Food and Drug Administration, the CDC, and other agencies and foundations.

Bernhardt became the sixth dean of the Moody College of Communication on March 1, 2016. Moody College is one of the largest and most comprehensive colleges of communication in the country with seven majors and nearly 5,000 students. Bernhardt's tenure has led to the development of many new programs including a four-year honors program, B.A. degree in communication and leadership and a “study away” program in New York City known as UTNY.  He increased graduate student funding and the four-year graduation rate to 80 percent, among the highest on campus.  He's recruited more than 50 new faculty members and established new research centers, institutes and programs. He's also prioritized issues of diversity, equity and inclusion and established the college’s first associate dean position with this portfolio.

Bernhardt became the thirteenth president of Emerson College in Boston, Massachusetts, assuming the position following the resignation of former president M. Lee Pelton in June 2021.

References

External links 
Jay M. Bernhardt at Moody College of Communication

1969 births
Living people
Centers for Disease Control and Prevention people
Emory University faculty
Rutgers University alumni
University of Florida faculty
University of Georgia faculty
University of Texas at Austin faculty